Dryophylax hypoconia is a species of snake in the family Colubridae. The species is endemic to South America.

Geographic range
D. hypoconia is found in Argentina, Brazil, Paraguay, and Uruguay.

References

Further reading
Cope ED (1860). "Catalogue of the Colubridæ in the Museum of the Academy of Natural Sciences of Philadelphia, with notes and descriptions of new species. Part 2". Proc. Acad. Nat. Sci. Philadelphia 12: 241–266. (Tachymenis hypoconia, new species, pp. 247–248).

Reptiles described in 1860
Taxa named by Edward Drinker Cope
Dryophylax
Reptiles of Argentina
Reptiles of Brazil
Reptiles of Paraguay